HSwMS Gotland (Gtd) is a defense submarine of the Swedish Navy.

It was built by Kockums, launched in 1995, and subsequently commissioned in 1996.

In 2015, Sweden's Defense Material Administration (FMV) signed a contract with Saab Kockums which included a mid-life upgrade of two members of the Gotland class, Gotland and Halland, for SEK 2.1 billion. Gotland is expected to return to the FMV in late 2018 following a series of platform and combat systems upgrades.

Construction
The submarine Gotland was designed and built by Kockums in Malmö and launched on 2 February 1995. The honor guard during the launching consisted of the amphibian company of the Fårösund Marine Brigade (FMB). Participants from Gotland included the governor, the municipal council chairman, the commander of the Gotland Military Command and the commander of FMB.

The submarine is essentially based on the Västergötland-class submarine, but with a lot of improvements. It has two diesel engines and two Stirling engines which gives air independence and doubled endurance compared with previous submarine types. A gas cycle drives a generator that charges the submarines battery which is connected to the propeller engine. For passive reconnaissance, she is equipped with circular sonar and flank array sonar.

Mid-life Upgrade 
In 2020, HSwMS Gotland did undergo a mid-life upgrade, as her sister HSwMS Uppland before her. During the upgrade, a number of systems that will be used in the next generation submarines, the Blekinge-class (A26),  was installed. More than 20 new systems on board the new Gotland-class was implemented, which contributes to their de-risking for the A26. This also offers training opportunities for the crew when they in the future deploy on board the A26.

The upgrade process entails many new systems, such as the Stirling AIP, a complete new mast suite, sonars and sensors as well as management and communication systems. In order to host all systems, the submarine has gained length to 62 m and another 200 ton in weight, to reach a deplacement (surfaced) of 1580 tons.

Lease to the United States Navy 
In 2004, the Swedish Government received a request from the United States of America to lease Gotland—Swedish-flagged, commanded, and manned—for one year for use in anti-submarine warfare exercises. The Swedish Government granted this request in October 2004, with both navies signing a memorandum of understanding on 21 March 2005.

Gotland was loaded on board the Norwegian semi-submersible heavy-lift ship, MV Eide Transporter, on 10 May 2005, for a month-long voyage over the Atlantic Ocean and through the Panama Canal to Naval Base Point Loma in San Diego, California, where it arrived on 27 June 2005. After a couple weeks of getting accustomed to the new environment, the exercises with United States Third Fleet began on 18 July 2005. The lease was extended for another 12 months in 2006.

Gotland managed to penetrate the defensive measures of Carrier Strike Group 7 undetected and snap several pictures of  during the December pre-deployment Joint Task Force Exercise 06-2 (JTFEX 06-2) in the Pacific Ocean (probably in the California Operating Areas), effectively "sinking" the aircraft carrier. The exercise was conducted to evaluate the effectiveness of the US Fleet against modern diesel-electric submarines, which some have noted as severely lacking. In 2001, during the exercise JTFEX 01-2 in the Caribbean Sea, the German U24 of the conventional 206 diesel-electric class "sank" the carrier Enterprise by firing flares and taking a photograph through its periscope.

In July 2007, Gotland departed San Diego for Sweden.

Raid against Kockums
In the early morning of 8 April 2014, the Defence Materiel Administration, known as FMV, with the help of the Swedish Army, raided the Kockums shipyard in Malmö, Sweden, then owned by German defense giant ThyssenKrupp Marine Systems. The goal of the mission was to confiscate material belonging to the Swedish state, especially hardware relating to the Stirling engines used in HSwMS Gotland. Although the raid was performed by military police it was not violent. After Kockums employees locked the gates blocking FMV's exit with the confiscated material, a long drawn-out negotiation ensued. A compromise was finally struck in which the hardware was to be stored at a shared secure area until further notice.  Since FMV was only interested in the hardware rather than the blueprints, the show of force was more likely part of a long political confrontation between the Swedish state and the owners of Kockums, rather than an attempt at discouraging espionage. Later in 2014, Kockums was sold to Saab Group.

Gallery

See also
 Air independent propulsion
 Stirling engines

References

External links 
 

1995 ships
Submarines of Sweden
Gotland-class submarines
Ships built in Malmö